Dawn Cunningham is a fictional character from the British soap opera Hollyoaks, played by Lisa Williamson. Williamson was cast as one of the original characters on Hollyoaks in 1995, and was the first member of the Cunningham family to arrive in the village, before the introduction of her family. However, she left in 1997 when the character died following a battle with leukemia.

Characterisation
Dawn is described as "spirited, independent and friendly to everyone ... her friends could always rely on Dawn for a shoulder to cry on". The Liverpool Echo described her as an "easy-going interior designer. She was someone who had time for everyone and a shoulder to cry on." The Independent described her as the "equally stunning" friend of Natasha and questioned how she could balance "wild weekends and the emotional demands of a divorced mother with a toyboy?" before asking "Will anyone care?"

Storylines
Dawn is the eldest of Gordon (Bernard Latham) and Angela Cunningham's (Liz Stooke) children. At sixteen, Dawn has an affair with her best friend Ruth Osborne's (Terri Dwyer) father Jack (Jimmy McKenna). She becomes pregnant and gives birth to a daughter, Bethany, who she puts up for adoption. Dawn befriends Natasha Andersen (Shebah Ronay). She works at Maddie Parker's (Yasmin Bannerman) mother's interior design shop and has continual problems with her mother's boyfriend, Terry Williams (Ian Puleston-Davies), but refuses to let anything get her down. Natasha dies after Rob Hawthorne (Warren Derosa) spikes her drink with drugs at Lucy Benson's (Kerrie Taylor) 18th birthday party. Dawn is so distressed that she tells Jambo Bolton (Will Mellor) about her daughter. Jambo gets in contact with Dawn's daughter and Dawn goes to see her. Dawn watches her from a distance while Jambo stands close by to provide her with a shoulder to cry on.

Dawn discovers that her mother, Angela, has breast cancer; upset by the news of her mother's condition, Dawn turns to Jambo. The pair kiss, but Dawn insists that they should remain friends. Dawn learns that Terry has run off, leaving her mother in debts of over £55,000. Dawn's bad luck continues when she learns that her daughter Bethany has kidney failure and she is her last hope. However, Dawn finds out that she is not compatible, so Gordon offers her his kidney instead. However, Gordon is not a match, so Dawn contacts Jack Osborne. Jack is shocked as he had not known about the pregnancy, but he is a match and the operation is a success. Jambo and Dawn realise they love each other. Dawn soon feels unwell and visits her doctor, only to discover that she has leukaemia. When Ruth finds out about her illness, she forgives Dawn for her affair with Jack. On Christmas Day, Jambo and Dawn hire a rowing boat and Jambo asks Dawn to marry him. Dawn, however, dies in his arms, the same day her niece Holly Cunningham (Karis Sharkey) is born.

Reception
The Daily Record said on the show "Favourites have to be Jude's sickly-sweet sister Dawn, whose untimely death caused much distress." They also commented on the character's death saying "When there's a problem with a character in Hollyoaks, they just kill them off."

References

External links
 Dawn Cunningham on the E4 website 

Hollyoaks characters
Cunningham family
Television characters introduced in 1995
Fictional characters with cancer
Fictional shopkeepers
Female characters in television